Melanie Anne Safka-Schekeryk (born February 3, 1947), professionally known as Melanie or Melanie Safka, is an American singer-songwriter. She is best known for the 1971–72 global hit "Brand New Key"," plus her version of "Ruby Tuesday" which was originally written and recorded by the Rolling Stones, her composition "What Have They Done to My Song Ma", and her 1970 international breakthrough hit "Lay Down (Candles in the Rain)" (inspired by her experience of performing at the 1969 Woodstock music festival).

Early life
Melanie was born and raised in the Astoria neighborhood of Queens, New York City. Her father, Frederick M. Safka (1924–2009), was of Ukrainian and Russian ancestry, and her mother, jazz singer Pauline "Polly" Altomare (1926–2003), was of Italian heritage. Melanie made her first public singing appearance at age four on the radio show Live Like A Millionaire, performing the song "Gimme a Little Kiss". She moved with her family to Long Branch, New Jersey, and attended Long Branch High School. Bothered by being pegged by her classmates as a "beatnik" in school, she ran away to California and, after her return to New Jersey, transferred to Red Bank High School in Red Bank, New Jersey; she graduated in 1964, though she was blocked from attending her commencement exercise due to an overdue library book.

Career

In the 1960s, Melanie started performing at The Inkwell, a coffee house in the West End section of Long Branch. After high school, her parents insisted that she go to college, so she studied acting at the American Academy of Dramatic Arts in New York, where she began singing in the folk clubs of Greenwich Village, such as The Bitter End, and signed her first recording contract.

Initially signed to Columbia Records in the United States, Melanie released two singles on the label. Subsequently, she signed with Buddah Records and first found chart success in Europe in 1969 with "Bobo's Party" which reached No. 1 in France. Melanie's popularity in Europe resulted in performances on European television programs, such as Beat-Club in West Germany. Her debut album received positive reviews from Billboard, which heralded her voice as "wise beyond her years. Her non-conformist approach to the selections on this LP make her a new talent to be reckoned with".

Later in 1969, Melanie had a hit in the Netherlands with "Beautiful People". She was one of only three solo women who performed at the Woodstock festival in 1969 and the inspiration for her first hit song, "Lay Down (Candles in the Rain)", apparently arose from the Woodstock audience lighting candles during her set (although most of the "candles" were actually matches or lighters). The recording became a hit in Europe, Australia, Canada, and the United States in 1970. The B-side of the single featured Melanie's spoken-word track "Candles in the Rain". "Lay Down" became Melanie's first top ten hit in America, peaking at No. 6 on the Billboard singles chart and achieving worldwide success. Later hits included "Peace Will Come (According To Plan)" and a cover of the Rolling Stones' "Ruby Tuesday".

In 1970, Melanie was the only artist to ignore the court injunction banning the Powder Ridge Rock Festival scheduled to be held on July 31, August 1 and 2, 1970. She played for the crowd on a homemade stage powered by Mister Softee trucks. Shortly following this performance, she played at the Strawberry Fields Festival held from August 7 to 9, 1970, at Mosport Park, Ontario. She also performed at the Isle of Wight Festival held between August 26 and 30, 1970, at Afton Down, where she was introduced by Keith Moon and received four standing ovations (she also appeared at the 2010 Isle of Wight festival). She was also the artist who sang to herald in the summer solstice at Glastonbury Fayre (later the Glastonbury Festival) in England, in June 1971. She performed again at Glastonbury in 2011, the 40th anniversary of the original festival.

Melanie left Buddah Records when they insisted that she produce albums on demand. In 1971, she formed her own label, Neighborhood Records, with Peter Schekeryk who was also her producer and husband. She had her biggest American hit on the Neighborhood label, the novelty-sounding 1972 number one "Brand New Key" (often referred to as "The Roller Skate Song"). "Brand New Key" sold over three million copies worldwide and was featured in the 1997 movie Boogie Nights.

When first released, "Brand New Key" was banned by some radio stations because some heard sexual innuendo in the lyrics. Melanie has acknowledged the possibility of reading an unintended sexual innuendo in the song, stating, "I wrote [Brand New Key] in about fifteen minutes one night. I thought it was cute; a kind of old thirties tune. I guess a key and a lock have always been Freudian symbols, and pretty obvious ones at that. There was no deep serious expression behind the song, but people read things into it. They made up incredible stories as to what the lyrics said and what the song meant. In some places, it was even banned from the radio ... My idea about songs is that once you write them, you have very little say in their life afterward ... People will take it any way they want to take it."

In a 2013 interview with music journalist Ray Shasho, Melanie revealed the true origin of "Brand New Key":

Of course I can see it symbolically with the key, but I just thought of roller skating. I was fasting with a twenty seven-day fast on water. I broke the fast and went back to my life living in New Jersey and we were going to a flea market around six in the morning. On the way back ... and I had just broken the fast, from the flea market, we passed a McDonalds and the aroma hit me, and I had been a vegetarian before the fast. So we pulled into the McDonalds and I got the whole works ... the burger, the shake and the fries ... and no sooner after I finished that last bite of my burger ... that song was in my head. The aroma brought back memories of roller skating and learning to ride a bike and the vision of my dad holding the back fender of the tire. And me saying to my dad ... "You're holding, you're holding, you’re holding, right?" Then I'd look back and he wasn't holding and I'd fall. So that whole thing came back to me and came out in this song. So it was not a deliberate or intentional sexual innuendo.

The follow-up single to "Brand New Key" was "Ring the Living Bell". To compete with this release, Melanie's former record company released "The Nickel Song", which she had recorded while still signed to Buddah Records. Both songs were simultaneous top-40 hits while "Brand New Key" was still on the charts – setting a record for the first female performer to have three top-40 hits concurrently.

She was awarded Billboards No. 1 Top Female Vocalist award for 1972. She has been awarded two gold albums (and a gold single for "Brand New Key"), and three of her compositions were hits for The New Seekers. She is also well known for her musical adaptations of children's songs, including "Alexander Beetle" and "Christopher Robin". When she became an official UNICEF ambassador in 1972, she agreed to forego a world tour in favor of raising money for the organization.

Melanie had another top-40 hit single in 1973 with "Bitter Bad", a song that marked a slight departure from the hippie sentiments of earlier hits (with lyrics such as "If you do me wrong I'll put your first and last name in my rock n' roll song"). Other chart hits during this period were the self-penned "Together Alone" and a cover of "Will You Love Me Tomorrow". In 1973, Melanie started to retreat from the spotlight to begin a family.

Later career

In 1976, Melanie released one album on Atlantic Records, Photograph, which was overseen by Ahmet Ertegun. The album was praised by The New York Times as one of the year's best, although it was largely ignored by the public. It was re-issued on CD in 2005 with an additional disc of unreleased material.

Also in 1976, Melanie appeared at the tribute concert for Phil Ochs, who had committed suicide on April 9 that year. Held on May 28 at New York City's Felt Forum, Melanie performed an emotional version of Ochs' song "Chords of Fame". She had also appeared with Ochs on stage in 1974 at his Evening with Salvador Allende concert (also held at the Felt Forum), along with Dave Van Ronk, Arlo Guthrie, Bob Dylan and others.

In 1983, Melanie wrote the music and lyrics for a theatrical musical, Ace of Diamonds, with a book by Ed Kelleher and Seymour Vall, based on a series of letters written by Annie Oakley. Though never fully produced, several staged readings were performed at the Lincoln Center starring Melanie as the narrator and pop singer and actress Annie Golden as Oakley.

In 1989, Melanie won an Emmy Award for writing the lyrics to "The First Time I Loved Forever", the theme song for the TV series Beauty and the Beast. With one exception, her albums were produced by her husband, Peter Schekeryk, who died suddenly in 2010. Her three children – Leilah, Jeordie and Beau-Jarred – are also musicians. Beau-Jarred is a guitarist and accompanies his mother on tour.

One of Melanie's later albums, Paled By Dimmer Light (2004), was co-produced by Peter and Beau-Jarred Schekeryk and includes the songs "To Be The One", "Extraordinary", "Make It Work" and "I Tried To Die Young". In early 2005 most of Melanie's back-catalog was re-released on the internet-only music label ItsAboutMusic.com. After a series of disagreements, the relationship between the artist and the label was severed.

In 2007, Melanie was invited by Jarvis Cocker to perform at the Meltdown Festival at the Royal Festival Hall in London. Her sold-out performance received critical acclaim, with The Independent saying, "it was hard to disagree that Melanie has earned her place alongside Joan Baez, Judy Collins, Joni Mitchell and Marianne Faithfull in the pantheon of iconic female singers. Meltdown was all the better for her presence." The concert was filmed for a DVD titled Melanie: For One Night Only, which was released in October 2007. She recorded "Psychotherapy", sung to the tune of the "Battle Hymn of the Republic", which parodies aspects of Freudian psychoanalysis. It has been played on The Dr. Demento Show. In 2012, Melanie headlined at the 15th annual Woody Guthrie Folk Festival, along with Arlo Guthrie and Judy Collins. The festival is held annually in mid-July to celebrate the life and music of legendary singer-songwriter and folk musician Woody Guthrie.

In October 2012, Melanie collaborated with John Haldoupis, the artistic and managing director of Blackfriars Theatre in Rochester, New York, to create an original musical about her love story with her late husband, Peter. Melanie and the Record Man made its world premiere on October 19, with performances scheduled until October 28. The musical, conceived and designed by Haldoupis, features the music of Melanie and tells the story of her meeting Peter, falling in love, and working together to produce her music. Melanie performed during the musical and was also the narrator. In June 2014, she toured Australia for the first time since 1977.

In April 2015, Melanie was inducted into Red Bank Regional's "Distinguished Alumni Hall of Fame". Melanie received the Sandy Hosey Lifetime Achievement Award at the Artists Music Guild's 2015 AMG Heritage Awards on November 14, 2015, in Monroe, North Carolina.

On New Year's Eve 2019, she performed on the BBC's Jools' Annual Hootenanny.

Personal life
Melanie married record producer Peter Schekeryk in 1968. They had three children: daughter Leilah was born on October 3, 1973; daughter Jeordie on March 27, 1975; and son Beau Jarred on September 11, 1980. Leilah and Jeordie, when aged 7 and 6, released a cover of "There's No One Quite Like Grandma" that charted in Canada, reaching No. 27. Peter died in 2010. Melanie was a vegetarian in the early 1970s; she also practiced fasting.

Melanie identifies herself politically as a Libertarian, stating: "I'm a total Libertarian, and I am not a Democrat, a Socialist, or a Republican." For a time, at the beginning of her career, Melanie was a follower of Meher Baba and this influenced some of her songs (such as "Love to Lose Again" and "Candles in the Rain"). She has stated that, in 2006, she underwent a life-altering experience with Mata Amritanandamayi or Amma ("Mother") as she is also known, or as the "hugging saint" from India, which inspired Melanie to write "Motherhood of Love". Melanie resides in Nashville, Tennessee.

Cover versions
Many notable artists have covered Melanie's compositions:
"Lay Down"
In 1971, Mott the Hoople released a version of the song on their Wildlife album. Vicky Leandros recorded it in German and English in 1972. In 1994, the Philadelphia indie rock band the Strapping Fieldhands recorded a three-track "no-fi" version of the song (as well as a reprise that closes the album) for the EP "In The Pineys". Australian singer Max Sharam's 1995 recording reached the top 40 on the Australian singles charts. Ké included a cover of the song on his 1996 debut album, I Am. In 1999, Meredith Brooks' released a version on her album Deconstruction which included backing vocals by Queen Latifah. In 2010, Emiliana Torrini recorded a rendition on the compilation album Stone Free. Beth Sorrentino recorded a cover on her 2011 album, Hiding Out. Greta Van Fleet plays a cover of the song during their live shows. Allison Crowe also recorded a version and released it on YouTube.

"Brand New Key"
In 1975, Brendan Grace in Ireland covered "Brand New Key" with substantially rewritten lyrics as "The Combine Harvester". The next year, it was covered by Scrumpy and Western band the Wurzels in the UK, where it reached number one on the UK Singles Chart and stayed there for two weeks. Macy Gray, Dolly Parton, and Cher have all performed "Brand New Key" in concert (the last on The Sonny and Cher Show). Country singer Deana Carter covered the song on her 1999 top-10 album Everything's Gonna Be Alright. The cellist band Rasputina had a version on the album Thanks for the Ether. Todd Rundgren played a cover on his 2018 tour. On August 1, 2018, at Daryl's House Club in Pawling, New York, Melanie joined Rundgren onstage to sing "Brand New Key".

A female-fronted punk trio, the Dollyrots, included a version on their album Because I'm Awesome. The 2006 American Idol runner-up, Katharine McPhee, covered the song as the bonus track on her 2010 Unbroken album. Olivia Newton-John covered the song on the soundtrack album for the film A Few Best Men in 2012. Jessica Frech covered the song on her 2012 Reality album. The New York-based singer Jaymay covered the song in 2013. In 2013, the cover of the song by The Voice contestant Kaity Dunstan hit No. 40 on the Australian ARIA Charts. Ray Conniff & The Singers did a cover version on their album I'd Like To Teach The World (In Perfect Harmony) album in 1971. Maddie Poppe covered it in the top-24 stage of American Idol season 1 on ABC and later went on to win. The Wiggles covered it on their 2022 album Rewiggled.

"What Have They Done to My Song Ma"
Daliah Lavi recorded a successful German version of the song in 1971, and Ray Charles released a cover (as "Look What They've Done to My Song, Ma") in 1972 which reached No. 65 on the Billboard Hot 100 and No. 25 on the R&B charts. The song has also been covered by many other artists, including Nina Simone, the New Seekers, Dalida, and Billie Jo Spears. Claudine Longet recorded a version on her 1971 album, We've Only Just Begun. Czechoslovakian singer Helena Vondráčková recorded it in 1971 as "Kam zmizel ten starý song" with Czech lyrics by Zdeněk Borovec. Yugoslav rock band Bajaga i Instruktori released a cover of it with lyrics in Serbian, called "Vidi šta sam ti uradio od pesme, mama". Ray Conniff & The Singers did a cover version on their album We've Only Just Begun in 1970. Lawrence Welk covered the track on his 1970 album, Candida. Jack Wild also covered the song on his 1971 record, Everything's Coming Up Roses.

In 1985. It was used in the 1970s as a commercial for Lifebuoy soap ("Look what they've done to my Lifebuoy"), and in the 1980s as a commercial jingle for Ramada Inn (as "Look what they've done to Ramada") and for Oatmeal Crisp cereal (as "Look what they've done to my oatmeal"). In October 2012, Miley Cyrus released a video of her own acoustic version of the song as part of her Backyard Sessions series. In 2015, Melanie joined her to duet on the song in addition to "Peace Will Come (According to Plan)".

"Beautiful People"
The Tokens recorded a cover on their 1970 album, Both Sides Now. The Dutch singer Mathilde Santing had a gold record and the first Top 10 hit version of "Beautiful People" in 1997. Die Goldenen Zitronen covered the song on their 2009 album Die Entstehung der Nacht. Sandra Bernhard covered the song on her I Love Being Me, Don't You? live album. Eve Graham recorded a cover on her 2005 album, The Mountains Welcome Me Home.

"I Really Loved Harold"
Tammy Grimes recorded the song as the b-side to her 1969 single "Father O'Conner". The track has also been covered by Swedish singers Lill Lindfors and Monica Törnell. Emiliana Torrini covered "I Really Loved Harold" on her 1996 Merman album. She has also recorded a version of "Lay Down".

"(Some Say) I Got Devil"
Nana Mouskouri recorded a French version of the song, entitled "Que je sois un ange", for her 1974 album of the same name. Will Oldham and Tortoise covered it on their 2006 covers album The Brave and the Bold. Morrissey covered it on his May 2019 covers album California Son. Peter Evrard, winner of Idool 2003, recorded a version on his debut album, Rhubarb.

Other songs
The New Seekers covered several Melanie songs, and also charted in the United States with "Beautiful People" (No. 67), "Look What They've Done to My Song Ma" (No. 14) and "Nickel Song" (No. 81). The latter track was also covered by Nana Mouskouri, in English, released on her Live at the Albert Hall double album in the early 1970s. There is also a German version of this by Lena Valaitis called "Ob es so oder so oder anders kommt" which was released in 1971.

Cissy Houston recorded Melanie's "Any Guy" for her debut album Presenting Cissy Houston in 1970. Della Reese recovered a cover of "Leftover Wine" on her 1970 album, Right Now. Dion covered "Close To It All" on his 1971 You're Not Alone album. Claudine Longet recorded a version of "Peace Will Come (According to Plan) on her 1971 album, We've Only Just Begun. Roger Kellaway covered "Centre of the Circle" on the 1972 album of the same name. An 11-year-old Björk sang "Christopher Robin" in Icelandic on her debut album, Björk.

Kiki & Herb opened their live album Kiki and Herb Will Die for You: Live at Carnegie Hall with "Close To It All" and also covered "Tonight's the Kind of Night" in the same show. A studio version of the latter song also appeared on their album Do You Hear What We Hear? and they also appeared in the 2004 film Imaginary Heroes singing the same track. Alison Moyet performed "Momma, Momma" on her 2005 live DVD One Blue Voice and as the B-side to her 2007 single "One More Time". "Cyclone" was covered by Ex Norwegian on their 2015 album, Pure Gold. "I Tried To Die Young" was covered by Jessica Frech on her 2012 album, Reality (featuring guest vocals by Melanie) and by Italian pop-punk band The Manges on their 2014 album, All Is Well. "Again" was covered by Amanda Palmer on her 2016 album You Got Me Singing. Ezra Furman covered "The Good Book" for the 2016 album Songs by Others and the soundtrack to the Netflix series Sex Education in 2020.

The 2003 Australian hip-hop track "The Nosebleed Section" by the Hilltop Hoods sampled "People in the Front Row" which was certified 6 x Platinum by the Australian Recording Industry Association. Hip-hop producer and co-owner of Don't Sleep Records, Phoniks sampled Melanie's "Do You Believe?" on his Wu-Tang Clan remix "Back in the Game" amassing almost 80 million views on YouTube proving more popular than both of the original tracks. In 2004, Kanye West sampled Melanie's "In the Hour" on a track entitled "Livin' in a Movie".

Discography

Born to Be (1968)
Melanie aka Affectionately Melanie (1969)
Candles in the Rain (1970)
The Good Book (1971)
Gather Me (1971)
Garden in the City (1971)
Stoneground Words (1972)
Madrugada (1974)
As I See It Now (1974)
Sunset and Other Beginnings (1975)
Photograph (1976)
Phonogenic – Not Just Another Pretty Face (1978)
Ballroom Streets (1979)
Arabesque (1982)
Seventh Wave (1983)
Am I Real or What (1985)
Melanie (1987)
Cowabonga – Never Turn Your Back on a Wave (1988)
Silence Is King (1993)
Silver Anniversary (1993)
Old Bitch Warrior (1996)
Low Country (1997)
Antlers (1997)
Beautiful People (1999)
Moments from My Life (2002)
Crazy Love (2002)
Paled by Dimmer Light (2004)
Ever Since You Never Heard of Me (2010)

Other credits
 Lyrics for the theme song of the Beauty and the Beast television series
 Recorded "I've Got New York" on The 6ths' Hyacinths and Thistles, 2000

References

Further reading
 Lambo, John. Melanie: The First Lady of Woodstock (2011).

External links

 Melanie's official website

1947 births
20th-century American guitarists
American Academy of Dramatic Arts alumni
American acoustic guitarists
American women singer-songwriters
American folk guitarists
American folk singers
American libertarians
American people of Italian descent
American people of Russian descent
American people of Ukrainian descent
Emmy Award winners
Guitarists from New York (state)
Guitarists from Tennessee
Living people
Long Branch High School alumni
Red Bank Regional High School alumni
People from Astoria, Queens
People from Long Branch, New Jersey
Singer-songwriters from Tennessee
Singer-songwriters from New York (state)
20th-century American singers
20th-century American women singers
21st-century American singers
21st-century American women singers
Buddah Records artists
20th-century American women guitarists